Varanasi cantonment is a census town in Varanasi tehsil of Varanasi district in the Indian state of Uttar Pradesh. The census town does not have a gram panchayat.  Varanasi Cantonment Census town is about 2 kilometers West of Varanasi railway station, 324 kilometers  South-East of Lucknow and 12 kilometers North of Banaras Hindu University.

Demography
Varanasi cantonment has 2,760 families with a total population of 14,119. Sex ratio of the census town is 824 and child sex ratio is 827.  Uttar Pradesh state average for both ratios is 912 and 902 respectively  .

Transportation
Varanasi cantonment is connected by air (Lal Bahadur Shastri Airport), by train  (Varanasi railway station) and by road.  Nearest operational airports is Lal Bahadur Shastri Airport and nearest  operational railway station is Varanasi railway station (22 and 2 kilometers respectively from Varanasi  Cantonment).

See also
 Varanasi Cantt. (Assembly constituency)
 Varanasi district
 Varanasi (Lok Sabha constituency)
 Varanasi tehsil

Notes

  All  demographic data is based on 2011 Census of India.

References 

Census towns in Varanasi district
Cities and towns in Varanasi district
Cantonment towns in Uttar Pradesh